Voimaosakeyhtiö SF is a Finnish company and a main shareholder of nuclear power company Fennovoima. Established in year 2006, the company holds 66 per cent of Fennovoima's shares. It is owned by companies which operate in energy production and industry, most of which are state-owned enterprises. The company is organized on the so-called "Mankala principle", commonly used in the energy industry in Finland, where the company's shareholders are bound to buy its product at cost and to answer for its finances without limit to their liability.

Organization

Management 
Voimaosakeyhtiö SF's CEO is Matti Suurnäkki and chairman of the board is Timo Honkanen. Vice chairman is Henri Hätönen and members of the board are Marko Haapala , Risto Kantola , Jarmo Kurikka , Mikael Lemström , Tony Lindström , Andreas Rasmus and Jukka Toivonen.

Shareholders 
On year 2016 the shareholders were:

References

External links 
 Official website

Electric power companies of Finland